Hypsipetes olivacea may refer to:

 Buff-vented bulbul, a species of bird found in Southeast Asia and Indonesia 
 Mauritius bulbul, a species of bird found on Mauritius